Xixuthrus is a small genus of long-horned beetles, found primarily on Pacific islands, including Indonesia, New Guinea, the Solomon Islands, and Fiji, and contains some of the largest living insect species, the giant Fijian long-horned beetle and the Taveuni beetle. These beetles have powerful jaws, and should be handled with care when alive. No scientists have yet seen a larva of this genus, although in Fiji, where three different species occur, the natives consider them to be a rare and special delicacy.

Systematics
The genus Xixuthrus is currently dividend in two subgenera: Xixuthrus s. str. and Daemonarthra Lameere, 1903. 
The latter differs from the former in the apically  acute (rather than rounded) lobes of the third tarsal segment.

Subgenus Xixuthrus Thomson, 1864  
 Xixuthrus arfakianus (Lansberge, 1884)
 Xixuthrus axis Thomson, 1877
 Xixuthrus bufo Thomson, 1878
 Xixuthrus costatus (Montrouzier, 1855)
 Xixuthrus domingoensis Fisher 1932
 Xixuthrus fominykhi Titarenko & Zubov 2018
 Xixuthrus ganglbaueri Lameere, 1912
 Xixuthrus granulipennis Komiya, 2000
 Xixuthrus gressitti Marazzi, Marazzi & Komiya, 2006
 Xixuthrus heros (Gräffe, 1868)
 Xixuthrus jakli Titarenko & Zubov 2018
 Xixuthrus lameerei Marazzi, Marazzi & Komiya, 2006
 Xixuthrus lansbergei (Lameere, 1912)
 Xixuthrus lunicollis Lansberge 1884
 Xixuthrus microcerus (White, 1853)
 Xixuthrus nycticorax Thomson, 1878
 Xixuthrus penrousi Titarenko & Zubov, 2018
 Xixuthrus pinkeri Titarenko & Zubov, 2018
 Xixuthrus sapolsky Titarenko & Zubov, 2018
 Xixuthrus solomonensis Marazzi & Marazzi, 2006
 Xixuthrus stumpei Titarenko & Zubov, 2018
 Xixuthrus terribilis Thomson, 1877 
 Xixuthrus thomsoni Marazzi, Marazzi & Komiya, 2006

Subgenus Daemonarthra Lameere, 1903 
 Xixuthrus helleri (Lameere, 1903)

References

External links

 Gallery of Xixuthrus-species
ZinRus In Russian but excellent images of several members of this genus. Locality information in English.

Prioninae
Cerambycidae genera